Warford may refer to:
Places
 Great Warford, Macclesfield, Cheshire, England, United Kingdom
 Little Warford, Macclesfield, Cheshire, England, United Kingdom

People
 Larry Warford (born 1991), American football guard
 John Warford (born 1947), mayor of Bismarck, North Dakota
 Mark Warford (born 1962), American director, musician, photographer, and entrepreneur